The Treaty of Fort Harmar (1789) was an agreement between the United States government and numerous Native American tribes with claims to the Northwest Territory.

History

The Treaty of Fort Harmar was signed at Fort Harmar, near present-day Marietta, Ohio, on January 9, 1789. Representatives of the Iroquois Six Nations and other groups, including the Wyandot, Delaware, Ottawa, Chippewa, Potawatomi and Sauk met with Arthur St. Clair, the governor of the Northwest Territory, and other American leaders such as Josiah Harmar and Richard Butler.

The treaty was supposed to address issues remaining since the 1784 Treaty of Fort Stanwix and the 1785 Treaty of Fort McIntosh; but, the new agreement did little more than reiterate the terms of those two previous documents with a few minor changes. The negotiations and document failed to address the most important grievances of the tribes, namely, the settlement of New Englanders in the Firelands portions of the Western Reserve, an area that extended into the territory set aside for the tribes.

Governor Arthur St. Clair had been authorized by Congress and Secretary of War Henry Knox to offer back some lands reserved for American settlement in exchange for the disputed Firelands of the Western Reserve. St. Clair refused to give up these lands and instead, through threats and bribery, negotiated a treaty that simply reiterated the terms of previous treaties. Many Native American leaders met prior to the treaty negotiations to determine an appropriate strategy.  Joseph Brant offered a compromise position which moved the boundary line to the Muskingum River.  Some hardline leaders rejected Brant's compromise, so Brant sent St. Clair a letter asking for early concessions; St. Clair refused, and accused Brant of acting for the British.  Brant decided to boycott negotiations with the United States, and suggested others do the same.  To make matters worse, white settler Lewis Wetzel murdered Seneca Chief Tegunteh on his way to Fort Harmar. (Wetzel was twice arrested for his crimes, but never otherwise punished.) Several regional tribes, such as the Shawnee and Miami, refused to participate when St. Clair refused to attend or sign the treaty, and therefore refused to abide by the treaty.

The new treaty did almost nothing to stop the rash of violence along the frontier from confrontations between settlers and Indians.  Many native nations were infuriated at the treaty, which recognized native rights to sell their lands, while claiming U.S. sovereignty and forcing native tribes to sell their lands immediately.  The failure of the treaty led to an escalation of the Northwest Indian War as a new Western Confederacy fought against settlement and invasion from the United States.  The war would continue for six years and see thousands killed, including some of the worst defeats in U.S. Army history, until the United States defeated the tribal alliance at the Battle of Fallen Timbers in 1794.

In the 1795 Treaty of Greenville, the tribes were forced to give up claims to most of what is now the state of Ohio. This treaty divided the Northwest Territory into two parts; one for the Native Americans and one for the United States settlers.

See also
Fort Harmar
List of treaties
Northwest Indian War

References

Laurence M. Hauptman, Conspiracy of Interests: Iroquois Dispossession and the Rise of New York State (2001).

External links
 Text of the Treaty

Harmar
Harmar
Harmar
Harmar, Treaty of Fort
Marietta, Ohio
Harmar
Aboriginal title in New York